Musa Luliga (born 24 September 1954) is a Tanzanian middle-distance runner. He competed in the men's 800 metres at the 1980 Summer Olympics.

References

1954 births
Living people
Athletes (track and field) at the 1980 Summer Olympics
Tanzanian male middle-distance runners
Olympic athletes of Tanzania
Place of birth missing (living people)